Admir Haznadar (born 25 July 1985) is a Bosnian-Dutch footballer who plays as a striker for K.V. Turnhout in Belgium.

References

procms.eu 

Dutch footballers
Dutch expatriate footballers
K.A.A. Gent players
Belgian Pro League players
Association football midfielders
Bosnia and Herzegovina emigrants to the Netherlands
Footballers from Sarajevo
1985 births
Living people
K.V.K. Tienen-Hageland players